Casnodyn (fl. first half of the 14th century) was a Welsh language poet born in Gilfai, near present-day Swansea, south-west Wales.

Bibliography
R. Iestyn Daniel (ed.), Gwaith Casnodyn (Aberystwyth, 1999). The only complete edition o Casnodyn's poetry.

Welsh-language poets
14th-century Welsh poets